The Dean of Norwich is the head of the Chapter of Norwich Cathedral in Norwich, England. The current Dean is Andrew Jonathan Braddock, who took up the position in late January 2023.

List of deans

Early modern

1538–1539 William Castleton (last prior)
1539–1554 John Salisbury (deprived)
1554–1557 John Christopherson (afterwards Bishop of Chichester, 1557)
1557–1558 John Boxall (also Dean of Windsor, 1557–59 and Dean of Peterborough, 1557–1559) (deprived)
1558–1559 John Harpsfield (also Archdeacon of London, 1554–1559) (deprived)
1560–1573 John Salisbury (restored)
1573–1589 George Gardiner
1589–1601 Thomas Dove (afterwards Bishop of Peterborough, 1601)
1601–1603 John Jegon (afterwards Bishop of Norwich, 1603)
1603–1614 George Montgomery (afterwards Bishop of Raphoe, 1605)
1614–1628 Edmund Suckling
1628–1654 John Hassal (deprived – Commonwealth)
1660–1670 John Crofts
1670–1681 Herbert Astley
1681–1689 John Sharp (afterwards Dean of Canterbury, 1689)
1689–1702 Henry Fairfax
1702–1714 Humphrey Prideaux
1724–1730 Thomas Cole
1731–1733 Robert Butts (afterwards Bishop of Norwich, 1733)

1733–1739 John Baron
1739–1761 Thomas Bullock
1761–1765 Hon. Edward Townshend
1765–1790 Philip Lloyd

Late modern

1790–1828 Joseph Turner
1828–1866 George Pellew
1866–1889 Meyrick Goulburn
1889–1909 William Lefroy
1909–1911 Henry Wakefield (afterwards Bishop of Birmingham, 1911)
1911–1919 Henry Beeching
1919–1927 John Willink
1927–1946 David Cranage
1946–1952 St Barbe Holland
1953–1969 Norman Hook
1970–1978 Alan Webster (afterwards Dean of St Paul's, 1978)
1978–1983 David Edwards (afterwards Provost of Southwark, 1983)
1983–1995 Paul Burbridge
1995–2003 Stephen Platten (afterwards Bishop of Wakefield, 2003)
2004–29 September 2013 (ret.) Graham Smith
21 June 20141 May 2022 (ret.): Jane Hedges
28 January 2023present: Andrew Braddock

Sources
British History Online – An Essay towards a Topographical History of the County of Norfolk: Volume 3: The History of the City and County of Norwich, Part I – Deans of Norwich
British History Online – Fasti Ecclesiae Anglicanae 1541–1857 – Deans of Norwich

References

Norwich
 
Dean of Norwich